The island of Cebu in the Philippines is home to various species of reptiles and amphibians. Supsup, et al. (2016) recorded a total of 13 amphibian species and 63 reptile species.

Brachymeles cebuensis is a rare skink endemic to Cebu. Secretive blind snakes such as Malayotyphlops hypogius and Ramphotyhlops cumingii are found on the island as well. Other endemic species in Cebu include the Cebu Flowerpecker (Diceaum quadricolor), Cebu Slender Skink (Brachymeles cebuensis), Cebu Cinnamon tree (Cinnamomum cebuense), and Black Shama (Copsychus cebuensis).

Amphibians
Bufonidae
Rhinella marina
Ceratobatrachidae
Platymantis dorsalis
Platymantis corrugatus
Dicroglossidae
Fejervarya moodiei
Fejervarya vittigera
Limnonectes leytensis
Limnonectes visayanus
Occidozyga laevis
Microhylidae
Kaloula conjuncta negrosensis
Kaloula picta
Kaloula pulchra
Ranidae
Hylarana erythraea
Rhacophoridae
Polypedates leucomystax

Reptiles

Turtles
Bataguridae
Cuora amboinensis amboinensis
Pelodiscus sinensis

Crocodiles
Crocodylidae
Crocodylus porosus

Lizards
Agamidae
Bronchocela cf. cristatella
Draco spilopterus
Gonocephalus sophiae
Hydrosaurus pustulatus
Dibamidae
Dibamus novaeguineae
Gekkonidae
Cyrtodactylus annulatus
Cyrtodactylus philippinicus
Gehyra mutilata
Gekko gecko
Gekko mindorensis
Hemidactylus frenatus
Hemidactylus platyurus
Hemidactylus stejnegeri
Hemiphyllodactylus insularis
Hemiphyllodactylus cf. typus
Lepidodactylus aureolineatus
Lepidodactylus herrei medianus
Lepidodactylus lugubris
Lepidodactylus planicauda
Pseudogekko atiorum
Scincidae
Brachymeles taylori
Brachymeles cebuensis  — endemic
Brachymeles gracilis
Emoia atrocostata
Eutropis cf. indeprensa
Eutropis multicarinata borealis
Eutropis multifasciata
Lamprolepis smaragdina philippinica
Lipinia auriculata
Lipinia quadrivittata
Parvoscincus steerei
Pinoyscincus jagori grandis
Tropidophorus grayi
Varanidae
Varanus nuchalis

Snakes
Acrochordidae
Acrochordus granulatus
Colubridae
Ahaetulla prasina preocularis
Calamaria gervaisi
Chrysopelea paradisi
Coelognathus erythrurus psephenoura
Cyclocorus lineatus alcalai
Dendrelaphis philippinensis
Dendrelaphis marenae
Lycodon capucinus
Psammodynastes pulverulentus
Pseudorabdion mcnamarae
Pseudorabdion oxycephalum
Elapidae
Hemibungarus gemianulis
Hydrophis cyanocinctus
Laticauda colubrina
Laticauda laticaudata
Ophiophagus hannah
Gerrhopilidae
Gerrhopilus hedraeus
Homalopsidae
Cerberus schneiderii
Lamprophiidae
Oxyrhabdium leporinum visayanum
Natricidae
Tropidonophis negrosensis
Pythonidae
Malayopython reticulatus
Typhlopidae
Malayotyphlops hypogius
Malayotyphlops luzonensis
Malayotyphlops ruber
Ramphotyphlops braminus
Ramphotyphlops cumingii

References

Supsup, Christian & Puna, Nevong & Asis, Augusto & Redoblado, Bernard & Fatima Panaguinit, Maria & Guinto, Faith & Rico, Edmund & Diesmos, Arvin & Brown, Rafe & Mallari, Neil. (2016). Amphibians and Reptiles of Cebu, Philippines: The Poorly Understood Herpetofauna of an Island with Very Little Remaining Natural Habitat. Asian Herpetological Research. 7. 151-179. 10.16373/j.cnki.ahr.150049.

'
'
'
Philippines